Chronicles II may refer to:

 Books of Chronicles
 Chronicles II (album), an album by Eloy